The 1972 Cork Senior Football Championship was the 84th staging of the Cork Senior Football Championship since its establishment by the Cork County Board in 1887. The draw for the opening round fixtures took place on 30 January 1972. The championship ran from 7 April to 19 November 1972.

Carbery entered the championship as the defending champions, however, they were beaten by Muskerry in the quarter-finals.

The final was played on 19 November 1972 at the Athletic Grounds in Cork between Nemo Rangers and University College Cork in what was their first ever meeting in the final. Nemo Rangers won the match by 2-09 to 0-08 to claim their first ever championship title.

Dinny Allen was the championship's top scorer with 1-18.

Team changes

To Championship

Promoted from the Cork Intermediate Football Championship
 Newcestown

Results

First round

Second round

Quarter-finals

Semi-finals

Final

Championship statistics

Top scorers

Top scorers overall

Top scorers in a single game

Miscellaneous

 Nemo Rangers win their first title.

References

Cork Senior Football Championship